Garver Hill is a mountain in Albany County, New York. It is located southeast of Huntersland. Cook Hill is located north-northeast and Henry Hill is located east-northeast of Garver Hill.

References

Mountains of Albany County, New York
Mountains of New York (state)